Eduardo Navarro Soriano (28 January 1979 – 29 September 2022), known simply as Eduardo, was a Spanish footballer who played as a goalkeeper.

Career
Navarro was born in Zaragoza, Aragon on 28 January 1979. He appeared in 150 Segunda División matches during six seasons, representing in the competition CD Numancia (three years), UE Lleida (two) and SD Huesca (one). His debut as a professional took place on 28 August 2004, as he appeared for the second club in a 1–2 home loss against Racing de Ferrol.

After retiring in 2014 at amateurs Utebo FC, Navarro became a goalkeeper coach.

Death
Navarro died in September 2022, at the age of 43, following a long illness.

References

External links

1979 births
2022 deaths
Spanish footballers
Footballers from Zaragoza
Association football goalkeepers
Segunda División players
Segunda División B players
Tercera División players
CD Binéfar players
UE Lleida players
UD Barbastro players
SD Huesca footballers
CD Numancia players